Pseudapis is a genus of bees belonging to the family Halictidae.

The species of this genus are found in Eurasia and Africa.

Species:

Pseudapis aculeata 
Pseudapis albidula 
Pseudapis albolobata 
Pseudapis algeriensis 
Pseudapis aliceae 
Pseudapis aliena 
Pseudapis amoenula 
Pseudapis ampla 
Pseudapis anatolica 
Pseudapis anomala 
Pseudapis anthidioides 
Pseudapis armata 
Pseudapis bispinosa 
Pseudapis bytinski 
Pseudapis carcharodonta 
Pseudapis cinerea 
Pseudapis diversipes 
Pseudapis dixica 
Pseudapis duplocincta 
Pseudapis edentata 
Pseudapis elegantissima 
Pseudapis enecta 
Pseudapis equestris 
Pseudapis fayumensis 
Pseudapis femoralis 
Pseudapis flavicarpa 
Pseudapis flavolobata 
Pseudapis fugax 
Pseudapis gabonensis 
Pseudapis glabriventris 
Pseudapis illepida 
Pseudapis inermis 
Pseudapis innesi 
Pseudapis interstitinervis 
Pseudapis kenyensis 
Pseudapis kingi 
Pseudapis kophenes 
Pseudapis lobata 
Pseudapis mandschurica 
Pseudapis megacantha 
Pseudapis monstrosa 
Pseudapis nilotica 
Pseudapis nubica 
Pseudapis ocracea 
Pseudapis opacula 
Pseudapis oxybeloides 
Pseudapis pallicornis 
Pseudapis pandeana 
Pseudapis patellata 
Pseudapis platula 
Pseudapis punctata 
Pseudapis punctiventris 
Pseudapis punctiventris 
Pseudapis rhodocantha 
Pseudapis riftensis 
Pseudapis riftinensis 
Pseudapis rufescens 
Pseudapis rugiventris 
Pseudapis sangaensis 
Pseudapis schubotzi 
Pseudapis semlikiana 
Pseudapis siamensis 
Pseudapis squamata 
Pseudapis stenotarsus 
Pseudapis sudanica 
Pseudapis tadzhica 
Pseudapis tobiasi 
Pseudapis trigonotarsis 
Pseudapis tshibindica 
Pseudapis uelleburgensis 
Pseudapis umtalica 
Pseudapis unidentata 
Pseudapis urfana 
Pseudapis usakoa 
Pseudapis usambarae 
Pseudapis valga

References

Halictidae